Watsachol Sawatdee (born 17 January 2000) is a Thai tennis player.

Sawatdee has a career high WTA singles ranking of 692, which she achieved on 21 October 2019. She also has a career high WTA doubles ranking of 680, which was achieved on 9 December 2019. Momkoonthod has won 1 ITF doubles title.

Sawatdee represents Thailand in the Fed Cup.

ITF Circuit finals

Singles: 1 (0 titles, 1 runners–up)

Doubles: 3 (1 title, 2 runners–up)

References

External links
 
 
 

2000 births
Living people
Watsachol Sawatdee
Watsachol Sawatdee